Tekoteko is a Māori language term for a carved human form (either the whole body or head), either freestanding or attached to the gable of a whare (house).

Reference 

Māori art
New Zealand sculpture